Liubiemithz Rodríguez Cevedo (born November 5, 1976) is a retired professional baseball second baseman. He had 93 at bats in Major League Baseball for the Chicago White Sox in the 1999 season. He was a switch-hitter and threw right-handed.

Career

Chicago White Sox
Rodríguez began his career with the Chicago White Sox organization in 1995 for the GCL White Sox. In 1996 and 1997, Rodríguez played for the A-ball Hickory Crawdads. In 1998, Rodríguez played for the advanced A-ball Winston-Salem Warthogs. On June 9, 1999, Rodríguez made his major league debut for the Chicago White Sox. Rodríguez made his final major league appearance in 1999, and spent 2000 with the Triple-A Charlotte Knights. In the majors, Rodríguez was a .237 career hitter with one home run and 12 RBI in 39 games. He played in Charlotte in 2001 as well. He became a free agent after the season.

Saraperos de Saltillo
In 2002, Rodríguez signed with the Saraperos de Saltillo of the Mexican League. He played in 47 games for the Saraperos, he hit .306/.377/.403, notching 57 hits.

Olmecas de Tabasco
Partway through the 2002 season, Rodríguez was traded to the Olmecas de Tabasco. He played in 22 games for Tabasco, hitting .288/.431/.327, including 15 hits. He became a free agent after the season.

Profumerie La Gardenia Grosseto
In 2003, Rodríguez signed with the Profumerie La Gardenia Grosseto of the Italian Baseball League. He became a free agent after the season.

Toros de Tijuana/Telemarket Ramini
In 2004, Rodríguez played for the Toros de Tijuana of the Mexican League and the Telemarket Ramini of the Italian Baseball League. He became a free agent after the season.

Langosteros de Cancun
In 2005, Rodríguez signed with the Langosteros de Cancun of the Mexican League. He played in 91 games in Cancun, notching a .331/.427/.508 batting line and 105 hits. He became a free agent after the season.

Newark Bears
In 2006, Rodríguez signed with the Newark Bears of the Atlantic League of Professional Baseball. Rodríguez hit .318/.383/.393 over 58 games in Newark and became a free agent following the conclusion of the season.

St. George Roadrunners
After not finding a team in 2007, Rodríguez signed with the St. George Roadrunners of the Golden Baseball League for the 2008 season. He played in 71 games for the club, hitting .317/.394/.449. He began the 2009 season with St. George before moving to the Atlantic league partway through the season.

Southern Maryland Blue Crabs
Partway through the 2009 season, Rodríguez joined the Southern Maryland Blue Crabs of the Atlantic League. He played in 36 games for the team, gathering 40 hits.

York Revolution
Further into the 2009 season, Rodríguez was traded to the York Revolution of the Atlantic League. He acquired 20 hits in 24 games for York to finish out the 2009 season. He began 2010 with York and played in 121 games with the team, hitting .296/.357/.391 along with 136 hits. In 2011, he played in 75 games for York, hitting .231/.297/.290. In 2012, Rodríguez played in 65 games for York, hitting .327/.364/.432. He became a free agent after the season.

De Angelis North East Knights
In 2013, Rodríguez signed with the De Angelis North East Knights of the Italian Baseball League. He appeared in 24 contests for the club and hit .245/.288/.287 with 23 hits before became a free agent at seasons end.

Milwaukee Brewers
On January 14, 2014, Rodríguez signed a minor league contract with the Milwaukee Brewers organization. He was assigned to the AZL Brewers to begin the season, but spent the year on the disabled list and was released by Milwaukee on October 31, 2014.

Rodríguez also played winterball in the Venezuelan League from 2006 to 2009 in between seasons.

See also
 List of players from Venezuela in MLB

External links
, or Baseball Italia, or Mexican baseball statistics, or Venezuelan Professional Baseball League statistics

1976 births
Living people
Águilas del Zulia players
Baseball players at the 2007 Pan American Games
Birmingham Barons players
Caribes de Anzoátegui players
Charlotte Knights players
Chicago White Sox players
De Angelis North East Knights players
Grosseto Baseball Club players
Gulf Coast White Sox players
Hickory Crawdads players
Langosteros de Cancún players
Leones del Caracas players
Major League Baseball players from Venezuela
Major League Baseball second basemen
Mexican League baseball second basemen
Mexican League baseball shortstops
Minor league baseball coaches
Newark Bears players
Olmecas de Tabasco players
People from Caracas
Rimini Baseball Club players
Venezuelan expatriate baseball players in Italy
Saraperos de Saltillo players
St. George Roadrunners players
Southern Maryland Blue Crabs players
Baseball players from Caracas
Tiburones de La Guaira players
Toros de Tijuana players
Venezuelan baseball coaches
Venezuelan expatriate baseball players in Mexico
Venezuelan expatriate baseball players in the United States
Winston-Salem Warthogs players
York Revolution players
Pan American Games competitors for Venezuela